Azam Jah (1797 – 12 November 1825) was the Nawab of the Carnatic Sultanate from 1819 to 1825.

Azam Jah ascended the throne on the death of his father Azim-ud-Daula in 1819. He ruled for a short period of time and died in 1825. Azam Jah was succeeded by his minor son Ghulam Muhammad Ghouse Khan.

References

See also 
 Bahar I Azam Jahi

1797 births
1825 deaths
19th-century Indian Muslims
Nawabs of the Carnatic